Francisco Floriano de Sousa Silva (born 21 September 1959) more commonly known as Fábio Sousa is a Brazilian politician. He has spent his political career representing Rio de Janeiro, having served as state representative from 2011 to 2019.

Personal life
Floriano is the son of Evaristo Lopes da Silva e Maria de Sousa Silva, and is married to Elias Pereira da Silva. He is a pastor in the neo-Pentecostal church Igreja Mundial do Poder de Deus.

Political career
Floriano voted in favor of the impeachment of then-president Dilma Rousseff. Floriano voted in favor of the 2017 Brazilian labor reform, and would oppose a corruption investigation into Rousseff's successor Michel Temer.

In 2017 Floriano was found guilty of diverting government funds for the usage of his church. He was also convicted of lying under oath and taking financial advantage of prisoners during his church's mission visits to prisons. As a result, he and his family were barred from visiting prisons in Rio de Janeiro and he was barred from running in the 2018 election.

References

1959 births
Living people
People from Rio de Janeiro (city)
Democrats (Brazil) politicians
Liberal Party (Brazil, 2006) politicians
Brazilian Pentecostal pastors
Members of the Chamber of Deputies (Brazil) from Rio de Janeiro (state)
Brazilian politicians convicted of corruption